The King James Study Bible is an edition of the King James Bible originally produced by Liberty University. It has undergone several name changes and is now sold by Christian publishing house Thomas Nelson in a mass-market edition. The theology in the study notes reflect conservative Christian theology.

Study Bibles
King James Version editions